Najoua Belyzel (born Najoua Mazouri December 15, 1981 in Nancy, France) is a French pop rock/electronic singer of Moroccan descent.

Biography 
Najoua was born in Nancy, France and grew up in a large family with three sisters and two brothers. Her parents are both from Morocco. Since childhood she showed an interest in music; by age 14, she had begun writing her own songs.

Starting in 2001, Najoua studied law at the University of Nancy, but left for Paris to pursue a career in music. She initially met success when she joined the group Benoît, who had a successful single called "Tourne-toi Benoît", which touched on the subject of homosexuality. The later singles from Benoit, however, only met with moderate success and eventually the group disbanded.

Najoua kept on working with the group's songwriter Christophe Casanave whose work had already been performed by popular French acts Steeve Estatof and Marc Lavoine. The two worked together on a song called "Stella", which would later appear on her debut album. The song "Née de l'amour et de la haine" was Belyzel's first demo in 2002.

In 2005, Najoua released her first single, titled 'Gabriel  (The Angel Gabriel), an electro-pop dance track, which became her signature song. A video was released to accompany the single by telling the 'story' behind the song: the video showed Najoua wearing angel wings while being attended by seraphs. She recently adopted the sitting Angel profile portrait of herself and used it on the album as her motif. 

Gabriel became a huge hit in France, Belgium, and Quebec, making it her best selling single which peaked at #3 on the Top 40 charts in France. Najoua also developed a very dramatic stage routine to encapsulate the song and its highly charged emotional content as was demonstrated in the celebrated 'back to school' performance in Lille in 2006. Najoua has said that the song has nothing to do with gay issues, as has been suggested, but concerns the unlikely love of a human girl for an archangel and questioned whether that can be reciprocated. So it's about Angelsexuality - not homosexuality. 

The video ends enigmatically and ambiguously with Gabriel being 'awakened' from stone with a kiss and his world is shattered (literally). The video was shot, very appropriately, in the stark interior and beautiful grounds of the ruined ancient Cistercian Abbaye de Notre-Dame du Val à MERIEL

On May 29, 2006, she released her debut album titled Entre deux mondes, which debuted at #7 on the French charts and at #1 on the iTunes France music store. In late 2006-2007, she embarked on a tour with other artists across France and Francophone Europe to promote her album. 
Two other singles were released, "Je Ferme les Yeux" in June 2006, which was also an electro-pop title, but it met with less success than "Gabriel." The theme was a prayer to God to make this world better. The third single was "Comme Toi" a song about duality and schizophrenia. The video clip featured two Najoua: a warrior-like blond and a trapped brunette.
The album is mainly electro-pop with some ballads. It deals with different themes such as love, friendship (Stella), war, and pedophilia (Docteur Gel) along with her distress and disappointment when Najoua came to Paris (Bons Baisers de Paris)

Najoua Belyzel also released a new single, "Quand revient l'été ", on September 10, 2007.

She has been compared to Mylène Farmer, mainly because the video clip for "Gabriel" was shot in the same abbey as one of Mylene's clips ("Je te rends ton amour") and because they write about similar themes. Nonetheless, Najoua says she never wanted to copy Mylene and that they both have their distinctive universes.

During the summer of 2008, she released a cover song of Marie Laforêt "Viens, Viens", but it was not meant to be a single.
Najoua returned with a new single "La Bienvenue". Some excerpts of the video clip were shown to her fans in December 2008 and the final clip was shown on TV in February 2009. The single became available on legal downloading platforms on February 13.
The song is about a girl who feels rejected in this world and who does not see the good in herself. The video features a mannequin who becomes alive (played by Najoua) who is then disappointed by the cruelty of the world and decides to return to her previous state.

Najoua's new album Au Feminin was released on November 23, 2009, three years after the first album. It includes a duet with Marc Lavoine called "Viola" as well as songs called "Hey Hey Hey, Ma Sainte-Nitouche, La Trève." Her song "Née de l'amour et de la haine" is also included.

In September 2014, after a period of five years, and much to the acclaim of her fans, Najoua released a new song Rendez-Vous' with accompanying video, shot in the night by the banks of the Seine in a deserted Paris. There is an acoustic live performance video of Rendez-Vous filmed under a bridge over the Seine at night. Najoua has parted with her previous label Scorpio and has released "Rendez-Vous" and a new album under 'Les Edition Gabriel'.

Discography

Albums
 2006 : Entre deux mondes (Also known as Entre deux mondes... En équilibre), #7 France, #46 Switzerland, 160,000 sales.
 2009 : Au Féminin #66 France 10,000 sales
 2019 : De la Lune au Soleil (Also known as Rendez-vous... De la lune au soleil) (03/15/2019)

Singles

References

External links
 www.najouabelyzel.net (in French)
 www.belyzel-najoua.com (in French)

French people of Moroccan descent
French people of Egyptian descent
Living people
1981 births
Musicians from Nancy, France
21st-century French singers
21st-century French women singers